The Euclid–Euler theorem is a theorem in number theory that relates perfect numbers to Mersenne primes. It states that an even number is perfect if and only if it has the form , where  is a prime number. The theorem is named after mathematicians Euclid and Leonhard Euler, who respectively proved the "if" and "only if" aspects of the theorem.

It has been conjectured that there are infinitely many Mersenne primes. Although the truth of this conjecture remains unknown, it is equivalent, by the Euclid–Euler theorem, to the conjecture that there are infinitely many even perfect numbers. However, it is also unknown whether there exists even a single odd perfect number.

Statement and examples 
A perfect number is a natural number that equals the sum of its proper divisors, the numbers that are less than it and divide it evenly (with remainder zero). For instance, the proper divisors of 6 are 1, 2, and 3, which sum to 6, so 6 is perfect.

A Mersenne prime is a prime number of the form , one less than a power of two. For a number of this form to be prime,  itself must also be prime, but not all primes give rise to Mersenne primes in this way. For instance,  is a Mersenne prime, but  is not.

The Euclid–Euler theorem states that an even natural number is perfect if and only if it has the form , where  is a Mersenne prime.

History 
Euclid proved that  is an even perfect number whenever  is prime. This is the final result on number theory in Euclid's Elements; the later books in the Elements instead concern irrational numbers, solid geometry, and the golden ratio. Euclid expresses the result by stating that if a finite geometric series beginning at 1 with ratio 2 has a prime sum , then this sum multiplied by the last term  in the series is perfect. Expressed in these terms, the sum  of the finite series is the Mersenne prime  and the last term  in the series is the power of two .

Over a millennium after Euclid, Alhazen  conjectured that  even perfect number is of the form  where  is prime, but he was not able to prove this result. It was not until the 18th century, over 2000 years after Euclid, that Leonhard Euler proved that the formula  will yield all the even perfect numbers. Thus, there is a one-to-one relationship between even perfect numbers and Mersenne primes; each Mersenne prime generates one even perfect number, and vice versa. After Euler's proof of the Euclid–Euler theorem, other mathematicians have published different proofs, including Victor-Amédée Lebesgue, Robert Daniel Carmichael, Leonard Eugene Dickson, John Knopfmacher, and Wayne L. McDaniel. Dickson's proof, in particular, has been commonly used in textbooks.

This theorem was included in a web listing of the "top 100 mathematical theorems", dating from 1999, which later became used by Freek Wiedijk as a benchmark set to test the power of different proof assistants. , the proof of the Euclid–Euler theorem had been formalized in 5 of the 10 proof assistants recorded by Wiedijk.

Proof 
For this formula to be valid, the sum of divisors of a number must include the number itself, not just the proper divisors. A number is perfect if and only if its sum of divisors is twice its value.

Sufficiency 
One direction of the theorem (the part already proved by Euclid) immediately follows from the multiplicative property: every Mersenne prime gives rise to an even perfect number. When  is prime,

Combining these,

Therefore,  is perfect.

Necessity 
For  to be perfect, the sum of its divisors must be twice its value:

For this equality to be true, there can be no other divisors. Therefore,  must be , and  must be a prime of the form .

References 

Theorems in number theory
Articles containing proofs
Leonhard Euler
Mersenne primes
Perfect numbers
Euclid